Elisabeth, Queen of Poland may refer to the following queens of Poland:

Elizabeth of Bosnia
Elizabeth Granowska
Elizabeth of Austria (1436–1505)
Elizabeth of Austria (1526–1545)

Polish queens consort